= Kumaranwali =

- Location in Pakistan
- Coordinates: 32°27′30″N 71°57′10″E
- Country: Pakistan
- Governorate: Punjab

Kumaranwali is a town located in Punjab, Pakistan.
